Stefan Karlsson may refer to:

Stefan Karlsson (badminton) (born 1955), Swedish badminton player 
Stefan Karlsson (footballer) (born 1988), Swedish footballer
Stefan Karlsson (professor) (born 1950), professor of molecular medicine and gene therapy
Stefan Karlsson (snowboarder) (born 1981), Swedish snowboarder
Stefan Karlsson, a player for the Sweden national bandy team
Stefan Karlsson (born Jan. 1964), Retired Swedish Army tank company commander, Director of the Swedish Tank Museum Arsenalen since 2011.